Qush Aghel (also Romanized as Qūsh Āghel; also known as Qūshābād) is a village in Belharat Rural District, Miyan Jolgeh District, Nishapur County, Razavi Khorasan Province, Iran. At the 2006 census, its population was 135, in 33 families.

References 

Populated places in Nishapur County